The Cleveland mayoral election of 1959 saw the third re-election of incumbent mayor Anthony J. Celebrezze.

General election

References

Mayoral elections in Cleveland
Cleveland mayoral
Cleveland
November 1959 events in the United States
1950s in Cleveland